A stockgrower (or stock grower) is someone who raises livestock.

Stockgrower may also refer to:

Cowman (profession)
Rancher
Cattle baron

See also
Grower (disambiguation)
Stockman (disambiguation)
Stockgrowers association
Lashing (ropework)#Stockgrower's lash